The Woman in White is a British mystery television series adapted from the novel of the same title by Wilkie Collins. It first aired on BBC 2 in five parts between 14 April and 12 May 1982.

Plot summary

Main cast
 Diana Quick as Marian Halcombe
 Ian Richardson as Frederick Fairlie
 John Shrapnel as Sir Percival Glyde 
 Jenny Seagrove as Laura Fairlie
 Kevin Elyot as Louis
 Alan Badel as Count Fosco
 Daniel Gerroll as Walter Hartright
 Georgine Anderson as Countess Fosco
 Anna Lindup as Fanny
 Deirdra Morris as  Anne Catherick
 Anna Wing as Mrs. Clements
 Carol MacReady as  Mrs. Michelson
 Jeannie Crowther as  Margaret Porcher
 Andrew Carr as  Fletcher 
 Hilary Sesta as  Madame Rubelle
 Pauline Jameson as Mrs. Catherick

References

Bibliography
 Baskin, Ellen. Serials on British Television, 1950-1994. Scolar Press, 1996.
 Miller, Ron. Mystery Classics on Film: The Adaptation of 65 Novels and Stories. McFarland, 2017.

External links
 

BBC television dramas
1982 British television series debuts
1982 British television series endings
1980s British drama television series
1980s British television miniseries
English-language television shows
Television shows based on British novels